Gol Darreh-ye Anuch (also Romanized as Gol Darreh-ye Anūch; also known as Gol Darreh and Gol Darreh-ye Anūj) is a village in Sefidkuh Rural District, Samen District, Malayer County, Hamadan Province, Iran. At the 2006 census, its population was 189, in 47 families.

References 

Populated places in Malayer County